Mallecomigas is a genus of spiders in the family Migidae. It was first described in 1987 by Goloboff & Platnick. , it contains only one Chilean species, Mallecomigas schlingeri.

References

Migidae
Mygalomorphae genera
Monotypic Mygalomorphae genera
Spiders of South America
Endemic fauna of Chile